"I Know You Got Soul" is a song recorded by Bobby Byrd with James Brown's band The J.B.'s. The recording was produced by Brown and released as a single in 1971. It reached #30 on the Billboard R&B chart. It was prominently sampled on the 1987 song of the same name by Eric B. & Rakim. The "you got it" is referenced in Static and in the song's remix.

An extended 4:42 version was issued on the James Brown's Funky People (Part 2) compilation album in 1988, with a notation that the long version was previously unreleased.

"I Know You Got Soul" appeared on the Grand Theft Auto: San Andreas soundtrack on the Master Sounds 98.3 station.

Sample Used
Eric B & Rakim - I Know You Got Soul
James Brown - Static
Public Enemy - Fight The Power
DJ DSK & Mystro - I Know You Got Sole

References

External links
 List of songs that sample "I Know You Got Soul"

1971 singles
Bobby Byrd songs
Funk songs
Songs written by James Brown
Songs written by Bobby Byrd
1971 songs
King Records (United States) singles